Flanders International Airport, Flanders Airport or  Kortrijk-Wevelgem International Airport  is an airport located in the town of Wevelgem, West Flanders in the Flemish Region of Belgium and partly also in the Bissegem section of the city of Kortrijk ( west.

History
The airport was created in 1916 by the Germans during the First World War.

In 2022 the airport attracted media attention after Zara Rutherford became the youngest woman to fly across the Earth solo. She both started and finished the program on the airport's grounds.

Features
There is a passenger terminal with police and customs on demand.

Alongside a section of the airport is a business park, some of which is restricted to enterprises undertaking airport related activities: several of the business park tenants have paid for direct private access to the runway. The aerodrome used to offer IFR ("instrument" or "blind flying") procedures, but as of June 2017 these had been withdrawn from the AIP. In 2019, an RNAV approach, GNSS based, is given in the AIP.

Uses
It is used mainly as a business airport. One of the main users of this airport is Abelag Aviation, though it is also used by flying clubs and schools. According to its official website, around 100,000 passengers used the airport every year.

Airlines and destinations 
There are no scheduled services offered from Flanders International Airport.

Ground transportation

By car 
The airport is situated on national road 8 (Brussels - Koksijde), nearby ringway 8 (Kortrijk), E17/A14 and the E403/A17 (Zeebrugge - Bruges - Tournai).

By bus 
Bus 40 operated by De Lijn connects the airport with Kortrijk and its railway station (local, national, international trains) and Menen and its railway station (national trains).

Statistics

References

External links 
 
 Wevelgem Airport (official site)

Airports in West Flanders
Airports established in 1916